Tara Pacheco van Rijnsoever (born 3 October 1988 in Arucas) is a Spanish sports sailor. At the 2012 Summer Olympics, she competed in the Women's 470 class with Berta Betanzos.  At the 2016 Olympics, she and Fernando Echavarri competed in the Nacra 17 class.

She was runner-up at the 2006 420 Female World Championships. At the 2017 Nacra 17 World Championships, she and Echavarri, who first teamed in 2014, won a silver medal.  They also won the silver medal at the 2017 European Championships.  She had previous won the European Nacra 17 title in 2014 with Iker Martinez.

References

External links
 
 
 
 

1988 births
Living people
Spanish female sailors (sport)
Olympic sailors of Spain
Sailors at the 2012 Summer Olympics – 470
Sailors at the 2016 Summer Olympics – Nacra 17
Sailors at the 2020 Summer Olympics – Nacra 17
470 class world champions
World champions in sailing for Spain
People from Arucas, Las Palmas
Sportspeople from the Province of Las Palmas